Roger Smart (born 1943) is a former footballer.

Roger Smart may also refer to:

Roger Smart (MP) (fl.1404), MP for Warwickshire
Roger Smart (Microsoap)